The Michigan Nature Association is a nonprofit conservation organization established in 1952. It currently has 176 nature sanctuaries in 58 counties throughout Michigan under its jurisdiction.

History 

In 1951, a bird study group in Macomb County was formed to protect wildlife, hoping to keep Michigan in a natural state. Their first project was protesting the destruction of a tern colony at Metropolitan Beach. Calling themselves the St. Clair Metropolitan Beach Sanctuary Association, they started weekend nature exhibits, guided tours, and published a study course. In 1955, the Junior Nature Patrol (JNP) was formed. With this growth, the group began looking to expand and do further conservation work.

The first purchase of a sanctuary was made in 1960 and named Red Wing Acres. Further properties were obtained through persuasion with landholders, and by 1965, the group renamed itself the Eastern Michigan Nature Association. Expansion into Northern Michigan led to the current name change of the Michigan Nature Association (MNA) in 1970. That same year MNA helped write and campaign for the Natural Beauty Roads Act in Michigan, now known as Michigan's Natural Beauty Roads Act of 1970.

In 1974, founder Bertha Daubendiek was awarded the Outstanding Michigan Volunteer of the Year by Governor Milliken for her work with MNA.  In 1979, MNA had secured its 50th sanctuary, with Daubendiek honored as Michigan resident of the Year by the Detroit News. The Michigan Women's Hall of Fame inducted Bertha Daubendiek in 1994 for her success launching her wild natural habitat projects.

During the years of 1986-87, Twin Waterfalls Nature Sanctuary became the Association's 100th property. 

MNA relocated its office to Williamston, Michigan, a small town just outside the Lansing area in 2002, followed by another relocation move near the Michigan town of Okemos in 2014. 

The Land Trust Accreditation Commission gave national accreditation to the Michigan Nature Association in 2014.

Sanctuaries 

Below are a few of MNA's sanctuaries listed by county:

References

External links

Michigan Nature Association
Michigan Nature Association Blog

Environmental organizations based in Michigan
Organizations established in 1952
Nature conservation organizations based in the United States
Protected areas of Michigan
1952 establishments in Michigan